The 2019 Shymkent Challenger was a professional tennis tournament played on clay courts. It was the third edition of the tournament which was part of the 2019 ATP Challenger Tour. It took place in Shymkent, Kazakhstan between 6 and 12 May 2019.

Singles main-draw entrants

Seeds

 1 Rankings are as of 29 April 2019.

Other entrants
The following players received wildcards into the singles main draw:
  Andrey Golubev
  Grigoriy Lomakin
  Dmitry Popko
  Dostanbek Tashbulatov
  Dimitriy Voronin

The following players received entry into the singles main draw as alternates:
  Anton Chekhov
  Timofei Skatov

The following players received entry into the singles main draw using their ITF World Tennis Ranking:
  Gijs Brouwer
  Sanjar Fayziev
  Konstantin Kravchuk
  Karim-Mohamed Maamoun
  Alexander Zhurbin

The following players received entry from the qualifying draw:
  Timur Khabibulin
  Vladyslav Manafov

Champions

Singles

 Andrej Martin def.  Dmitry Popko 5–7, 6–4, 6–4.

Doubles

 Jurij Rodionov /  Emil Ruusuvuori def.  Gonçalo Oliveira /  Andrei Vasilevski 6–4, 3–6, [10–8].

References

2019 ATP Challenger Tour
2019
2019 in Kazakhstani sport
May 2019 sports events in Asia